Mohamed Abdallah Ahmed nicknamed Mazda, is a Sudanese football coach, former player and the former manager of the national side. Abdallah was in charge at the 2012 Africa Cup of Nations, guiding them to the quarterfinals of the tournament.

Abdallah, a University professor, had previously been captain of the Sudanese national team. As a player, he was involved in the 1974 and 1986 FIFA World Cup qualifying campaigns.

References

Year of birth missing (living people)
Living people
Sudanese footballers
Sudan international footballers
Sudanese football managers
Sudan national football team managers
2008 Africa Cup of Nations managers
2012 Africa Cup of Nations managers
Sudanese academics

Association footballers not categorized by position